Bronzani Majdan is a village in the municipality of Banja Luka, Republika Srpska, Bosnia and Herzegovina.

Demographics
Ethnic groups in the village includes:
570 Serbs (92.83%)
32 Bosniaks (5.21%)
12 Others (1.96%)

References

Villages in Republika Srpska
Populated places in Banja Luka